The Ravensberg Basin or Ravensberg Hills  is a natural region in the governorate of Detmold in the northeastern part of the German state of North Rhine-Westphalia; small elements also fall within the neighbouring state of Lower Saxony. It is part of the lower Weser Uplands and includes the hilly basin country between the Wiehen Hills in the north, Lippe Uplands in the east, Teutoburg Forest in the south and Osnabrück Hills in the west. The heart of the Ravensberg Basin is almost coincident with the cultural region of the Ravensberg Land.

See also 
 County of Ravensberg
 Ravensberg Land
 Ravensberg Castle
 Minden-Ravensberg (old administrative unit)

Sources 
 Adolf  Schüttler: Das Ravensberger Land.  Aschendorff, Münster 1986.
 Emil Meynen (Hrsg.): Handbuch der naturräumlichen Gliederung Deutschlands. Selbstverlag der Bundesanstalt für Landeskunde, Remagen 1959-1962 (Teil 2, enthält Lieferung 6-9), ISBN B0000BJ19F

External links 
 BfN landscape fact file, sparsely-settled outer areas of the Ravensberg Basin
 BfN landscape fact file, densely populated core (here with Bad Salzuflen)
  Ecological characteristics

Regions of North Rhine-Westphalia
Herford (district)
Gütersloh (district)
Lippe
Geography of North Rhine-Westphalia
!